The Cyrus School (in Persian: Kūrosh) was a school founded in 1931 in Tehran by members of its Iranian Jewish community. It was largely the idea of the Zionist activists Farajollah Hakem and Habib Levy, but the two also received help from Esmail Hayy, Aziz Elqanyan, Rabbi Azizollah ben Yuna Na'im and several others. The Cyrus School was initially founded as an elementary institution; however, it soon expanded to also offer high school grades. In contrast to the schools founded by the Alliance Israélite Universelle, the Cyrus School's emphasized Hebrew and Persian rather than French.

References

Defunct schools in Iran
Schools in Tehran
1931 establishments in Iran
Jews and Judaism in Persia and Iran
Jewish schools